Letino is a comune and small village in the province of Caserta, in Campania, southern Italy.

It was one of the villages liberated by the Italian Libertarian Communist Insurrection of 1877 by Errico Malatesta, Carlo Cafiero, Pietro Cesare Ceccarelli, the Russian Stepniak and 30 other comrades. Another village in the same province, Gallo Matese, was also involved.

References

External links
Letino photos

Cities and towns in Campania